Corgatha atrifalcis is a moth in the family Erebidae. It is found in Sri Lanka.

References

Boletobiinae
Moths of Sri Lanka
Moths described in 1907
Taxa named by George Hampson